Vega is an unincorporated community in central Alberta within the County of Barrhead No. 11.

County of Barrhead No. 11
Localities in the County of Barrhead No. 11